The following lists events that happened during 1846 in Australia.

Incumbents

Governors
Governors of the Australian colonies:
Governor of New South Wales – Sir George Gipps
Governor of South Australia – Lieutenant Colonel Frederick Holt Robe
Governor of Tasmania – Sir John Eardley-Wilmot
Governor of Western Australia as a Crown Colony – John Hutt, then Lieutenant-Colonel Andrew Clarke.

Events

 formation of "The South Australian League for the Maintenance of Religious Freedom in the Province" in response to the proposed funding of Church of England education from public funds

September 

 23 September – Explorer John Ainsworth Horrocks dies at Penwortham in South Australia, a month after he accidentally shot himself in a hunting accident.

October 

 13 October – Bushranger Lawrence Kavenagh is executed by hanging.

Arts and literature
 2 June – first editions of Melbourne's daily newspaper, The Argus; and of Brisbane's weekly newspaper, Moreton Bay Courier, are published.

Sport
 February – Australia's first swimming championships are held at Robinson's Domain Baths.

Births
 4 January – John Neild, New South Wales politician (born in the United Kingdom) (d. 1911)
 10 February – Sir James Burns, New South Wales politician, shipowner and philanthropist (born in the United Kingdom) (d. 1923)
 17 February – Sir John George Davies, Tasmanian politician, newspaper proprietor and cricketer (d. 1913)
 17 March – Edward O'Sullivan, New South Wales politician and journalist (d. 1910)
 24 April – Marcus Clarke, author (born in the United Kingdom) (d. 1881)
 4 May – Jack Want, New South Wales politician (d. 1905)
 15 July – William Trenwith, 1st Leader of the Victorian Labor Party (d. 1925)
 17 July – Nicholas Miklouho-Maclay, explorer, ethnologist and anthropologist (born and died in the Russian Empire) (d. 1888)
 7 August – William Spence, trade union leader and politician (born in the United Kingdom) (d. 1926)
 27 September – Sir Josiah Symon, South Australian politician (born in the United Kingdom) (d. 1934)
 7 October – Charles Rasp, prospector (born in Germany) (d. 1907)
 20 October – Sir William MacGregor, 11th Governor of Queensland (born in the United Kingdom) (d. 1919)
 7 November – Sir Stephen Henry Parker, 5th Chief Justice of Western Australia (d. 1927)
 18 November – Lord Northcote, 3rd Governor-General of Australia (born in the United Kingdom) (d. 1911)
 14 December – John Dunn, bushranger (d. 1866)
 16 December – William Miller, athlete (born in the United Kingdom) (d. 1939)

Deaths
 16 March – Henry Kable, convict and businessman (born in the United Kingdom) (b. 1763)
 20 March – Joseph Foveaux, soldier and convict settlement administrator (born and died in the United Kingdom) (b. 1767)
 15 April – Robert Campbell, New South Wales politician and merchant (born in the United Kingdom) (b. 1769)
 26 August – Esther Abrahams, convict (born in the United Kingdom) (b. 1767/1771)
 23 September – John Ainsworth Horrocks, pastoralist and explorer (born in the United Kingdom) (b. 1818)
 13 October – Lawrence Kavenagh, bushranger (born in Ireland) (b. 1810)
 12 December – Charles Alexandre Lesueur, naturalist, artist and explorer (born and died in France) (b. 1778)

References

 
Australia
Years of the 19th century in Australia